Mayorasgo de Koka was a  tract of land in what was at its inception in Haiti, but since 1844 is in the Dominican Republic. After renting it in 1837, Zephaniah Kingsley purchased it in 1838. As whites were barred from land ownership in Haiti it was titled in the name of Zephaniah's eldest son, the mixed-"race" George Kingsley (whose mother was Kingsley's African then-enslaved concubine/wife Anna). It is currently located in the province of Puerto Plata, on the north coast of the Dominican Republic.

Beginning in 1828, the legislature of the new U.S. Territory of Florida passed a series of laws that progressively removed the rights that free persons of color had enjoyed in Spanish Florida. After failed attempts at stopping these laws through politics and advocacy, Kingsley moved his mixed-"race" family—as well as a total of 53 former slaves which he freed from his plantations in Florida—to the estate. The former slaves became indentured servants. There they were guaranteed equality by the laws of the Republic of Haiti, the first independent country in the world established by former African slaves. Anna Kingsley lived there from 1838 to 1846, when she returned to Florida.

The economy of the estate was mostly agricultural and included some mahogany logging. As the number of Kingsley descendants grew, they turned to cattle grazing and further divided the property into smaller tracts of land. Some descendants moved to urban areas and gradually lost control of the land to peasant farmers. Today, some descendants of Zephaniah Kingsley as well as of his former Florida slaves still live in the area. The village of Cabaret, within the former plantation, is today the windsurfing tourist town of Cabarete.

There are no markers and no historic buildiings.

References

1830s in Haiti
American expatriates in Haiti
American expatriates in the Dominican Republic
1830s in the Dominican Republic
1838 establishments in the Dominican Republic
1838 establishments in Haiti
Puerto Plata Province
Coca
Zephaniah Kingsley
Tourist attractions in the Dominican Republic